Bulmershe School is a coeducational comprehensive school located in Woodley, Berkshire.

History
Building work completed in 2016 on the construction of a new school building housing a 392-seat auditorium, six classrooms with computer workstations and a new sixth form area. The Bulmershe Auditorium includes a 392-seat theatre (equipped with professional audio-visual equipment), a sixth-form centre, meeting rooms, a reception area, and administrative offices.

The Bulmershe School was rated as a good school by the Office for Standards in Education OFSTED, following an inspection in November 2017.

The head teacher is Amanda Woodfin, who became Acting Headteacher on 1 September 2017 and joined the school in January 2013.

In 2018 work started on a new sports centre and swimming pool.

There were 1,215 students on roll at the time of the 2019 CENSUS. The majority of the students come from Woodley and Earley.

References

External links
The Bulmershe School website
The Bulmershe Community Association website
School overview from Schoolsfinder
DFES statistics
Record of success at Bulmershe School
BBC News profile of The Bulmershe School
2004 OFSTED report
2008 OFSTED report
2017 OFSTED report
Bulmershe Gym Club
Bulmershe BBC report 2017

Secondary schools in the Borough of Wokingham
Community schools in the Borough of Wokingham
Educational institutions established in 1964
1964 establishments in England